Tāpatraya refers to the three sources of Tāpa (literally, heat, or suffering) recognised in Hindu philosophy:
Ādhyātmika — the suffering caused by 'internal' factors like diseases
Ādhibhoutika — the suffering caused by physical forces such as earthquakes etc.
Ādhidaivika — the suffering caused by Karmic factors

Hindu philosophical concepts